Baron Hans Fredrik "Hasse" Funck (born 14 June 1917 in Linköping, died 22 December 2004 (aged 87)) was a Swedish baron, director, and operetta singer, dancer, and actor.

He came to Malmö in 1939 and during a few years he was engaged at Malmö City Theatre and Hippodromen. 
In 1951 he started a show school in Stockholm, where he started an activity called Minifunckarna in 1965, where he educated children in acting, and after that many people participated in radio and TV as in films.
He often participated in his brother Thomas' films/programs about Kalle Stropp and his friends.

Filmography
1954 – Dans på rosor
1954 – Brudar och bollar eller Snurren i Neapel
1973? – Kul i jul
1973 – Tom Sawyers äventyr

Director
1956 – Charlie Strap, Froggy Ball and Their Friends

References

1917 births
2004 deaths
Barons of Sweden
Swedish male dancers
Swedish male actors
Swedish film directors